Adams is an unincorporated community in Adams Township, Decatur County, Indiana.

History
Adams was laid out in 1855, soon after the railroad was extended to that point. It was named after the township it is in.

Geography

References

Unincorporated communities in Decatur County, Indiana
Unincorporated communities in Indiana